Tush Magazine is a Nigerian-based glossy full colour magazine which is released quarterly both in print and digital versions of the magazine. It targets the youth market and its contents include articles, coverage and interviews which focus on music, fashion, movie, art, technology, events, relationships, and business. Published by Tush Kingdom Media, Tush Magazine has 22 issues, is printed in English language and is distributed all over Nigeria and on the internet. Tush Magazine also has a Meet and Greet events where personalities featured in each issue give out free autographed copies of Tush Magazine alongside other gifts.

History 
Tush Magazine was launched in February 2012 but started operations in August 2012. Artists who have been on the covers of Tush Magazine NG include: Charity {Most beautiful girl in Nigeria, ECOWAS 2009}. Ice Prince, Eva, Hakym, Jerrilyn (Liberia), Yung6ix, Yemi Alade, Skales, Seyi Shay, Emma Nyra, Endia, Ehiz (MTV Base), Enzo, Dammy Krane, Di'Ja, Victoria Kimani, Cynthia Morgan, Praiz, D'banj, Banky W MI Abaga, Jesse Jagz, Adekunle Gold, Aramide (musician) and BOJ, Ice Prince, Toni Tones, Olamide, YCEE, Beverly Naya, DJ Spinall, Kehinde Bankole  Enyinna, Niniola, Frank Donga, Nasty C

Tush Magazine has built a strong relationship with several media and music related companies within and outside the shores of Nigeria, it also hosted a session at the Social Media Week where it talked about the benefits of combining digital and print publishing for publishers. So far, Tush Magazine has witnessed two Meet and Greet events featuring Emma Nyra, Endia & OD Woods and also another event featuring Praiz, Goddess of Skillz & DJ Lo.

Its digital magazine is also available for subscription and downloads across major African blogs and on Magzter - the largest digital newsstand in the world.

References

External links
 Official website

Magazines published in Nigeria
Online magazines published in Nigeria